Addison Byron Owen Randall (May 12, 1906 – July 16, 1945) was an American film actor, chiefly in Westerns. He often used a pseudonym for his film work, chiefly Jack Randall, though he played roles as Allen Byron and Byron Vance too.

Early life
Randall was born May 12, 1906, in San Fernando, California as 
Addison Byron Owen Randall. He
attended Kemper Military School in Boonville, Missouri. The reference book Who's Who in Hollywood gives Randall's place of birth as Quincy, Illinois.

Film career

Randall began his career as a supporting actor and foil at RKO, but he left when Monogram Pictures promised him the chance to star in films. They were true to their word, and he appeared in a series of Western films through the 1930s and 1940s. (In 1935, he actually played a star of Westerns in RKO's Another Face, released in 1935.) 

Many of Randall's early B-movies with Monogram feature him as a singing cowboy, but his later roles were generally straight Western stories, and all were hampered by the low budgets typical of that studio.  Many of his cowboy characters were named "Jack". His older brother Robert Livingston (born Robert Edward Randall) was also an actor in Western films of the time.

Randall adopted his new "Allen Byron" identity in the 1940s in an effort to boost his fading professional fortunes, but the roles he received with new studio Producers Releasing Corporation were not up to the task.

Death
He died unexpectedly in 1945 while filming a serial called The Royal Mounted Rides Again for Universal Studios, after a fall from a horse at Canoga Park, California, in which he struck a tree. Some sources attribute his death to injuries sustained during the fall, which in those versions resulted from an attempt to recover a hat he had dropped, while others state that he suffered a fatal heart attack before falling. He is interred at Forest Lawn Memorial Park in Glendale, California, in the Garden of Memory, near his older brother, Robert Livingston.

Personal life
Randall twice married and divorced actress Louise Stanley, and carried on an  affair with former silent film actress Louise Brooks. At the time of his death he was married to his second wife, actress Barbara Bennett,  sister of actresses Constance Bennett and Joan Bennett.

Partial filmography

 His Family Tree (1935) as Mike Donovan
 Another Face (1935) as Tex Williams
 Two in the Dark (1936) as Duke Reed
 Love on a Bet (1936) as Jackson
 Mariners of the Sky (1936) aka Navy Born as Lt. Tex Jones
 Don't Turn 'Em Loose (1936) as Al - Henchman
 Red Lights Ahead (1936) as Nordingham
 Flying Hostess (1936) as Earl Spencer
 Danger Valley (1937) as Jack Bruce
 Stars Over Arizona (1937) as Jack Dawson
 Riders of the Dawn (1937) as Marshal Josh Preston
 Blazing Barriers (1937) as Arthur Forsythe
 Wild Horse Canyon (1938) as Jack Gray
 Gun Packer (1938) as Jack Denton
 The Mexicali Kid (1938) as Jack Wood
 Man's Country (1938) as Jack Haid
 Gunsmoke Trail (1938) as Jack Lane
 Land of Fighting Men (1938) as Jack Lambert
 Where the West Begins (1938) as Jack Manning
 Overland Mail (1939) as Jack Mason
 Oklahoma Terror (1939) as Jack Ridgley
 Across the Plains (1939) as Jack Winters - Cherokee
 Trigger Smith (1939) as Jack 'Trigger' Smith aka Arizona Jones
 Drifting Westward (1939) as Jack Martin
 Riders from Nowhere (1940) as Jack Rankin
 Wild Horse Range (1940) as Jack Wallace
 The Kid from Santa Fe (1940) as Santa Fe Kid
 Land of the Six Guns (1940) as Jack Rowan
 Covered Wagon Trails (1940) as Jack Cameron
 The Cheyenne Kid (1940) as The Cheyenne Kid
 Pioneer Days (1940) as Jack Dunham
 High Explosive (1943) as Joe
 Girls in Chains (1943) as Johnny Moon
 Danger! Women at Work (1943) as Danny
 Cry 'Havoc' (1943) as Lt. Thomas Holt

References

External links

1906 births
1945 deaths
Male Western (genre) film actors
American male film actors
People from San Fernando, California
Male actors from California
20th-century American male actors
Burials at Forest Lawn Memorial Park (Glendale)